Air Atlanta Europe was an airline based at London Gatwick Airport, England. It provided long term wet-lease contract flights for Excel Airways (rebranded as XL Airways UK), Virgin Atlantic and others, as well as ad hoc flights tailored to customer requirements.

On 1 May 2006, Air Atlanta Europe was absorbed into Excel Airways.

History
Air Atlanta Europe Limited was incorporated in the United Kingdom on 9 April 2002. It commenced operations in June 2003. The company held a United Kingdom Civil Aviation Authority Type A Operating Licence that permitted it to carry passengers, cargo and mail on aircraft with 20 or more seats. It was revoked on 8 November 2006.

A number of Boeing 747s were operated for the tour operator Travel City Direct and painted with Travel City Direct titles.

Destinations

Air Atlanta Europe operated from:
Cardiff
Manchester
Glasgow
London Gatwick

Air Atlanta Europe operated to these destinations in August 2005:
Hurghada
Sharm El Sheik
Orlando Sanford International 
Orlando Sanford International (On behalf of Travel City Direct)
Faro
Paphos
Tenerife
Arrecife

Fleet
As of August 2006 the Air Atlanta Europe fleet includes:

1Boeing 747-300
2Boeing 767-300ER

The airline had also previously operated the Boeing 747-200.

See also
 List of defunct airlines of the United Kingdom

References

External links

Air Atlanta Europe Fleet Detail
Photo
Photo: TF-ARS

Airlines established in 2002
Airlines disestablished in 2006
Defunct airlines of the United Kingdom
2002 establishments in the United Kingdom
2006 disestablishments in the United Kingdom